Hyles apocyni is a moth of the  family Sphingidae. It is known from Tajikistan and Turkmenistan.

The larvae feed on Apocynum species.

References

Hyles (moth)
Moths described in 1956